The 2008–09 UEFA Champions League group stage matches took place between 16 September and 10 December 2008.

Seeding structure
Seeding was determined by the UEFA coefficients: Pot 1 held teams ranked 1–10 (since Milan and Sevilla did not qualify), Pot 2 held teams ranked 11–23, Pot 3 held teams ranked 25–45, while Pot 4 held teams ranked 46–193 and unranked teams.

Clubs from the same association were paired up to split the matchdays between Tuesday and Wednesday. Clubs with the same pairing letter played on different days, ensuring that teams from the same city (e.g. Milan and Internazionale, who also share a stadium) did not play on the same day.

Of the 16 teams in Pots 1 and 2, 14 eventually qualified for the first knockout round. The exceptions were Werder Bremen (to the UEFA Cup) and PSV (eliminated). Their places went to Panathinaikos (from Pot 3) and Atlético Madrid (from Pot 4). Aalborg BK were the lowest-ranked Pot 4 team to qualify for the UEFA Cup Round of 32.

Tie-breaking criteria
Based on paragraph 6.05 in the UEFA regulations for the current season, if two or more teams were equal on points on completion of the group matches, the following criteria were applied to determine the rankings:
higher number of points obtained in the group matches played among the teams in question;
superior goal difference from the group matches played among the teams in question;
higher number of goals scored away from home in the group matches played among the teams in question;
superior goal difference from all group matches played;
higher number of goals scored in all group matches played;
higher number of coefficient points accumulated by the club in question, as well as its association, over the previous five seasons.

Groups
Times are CET/CEST, as listed by UEFA (local times are in parentheses).

Group A

Group B

Group C

Group D

Group E

Group F

Group G

Group H

Notes

References

Group Stage
UEFA Champions League group stages